Time travel is the hypothetical concept of traveling through multiple points in time.

Time travel may also refer to:

 Time travel claims and urban legends
 Time travel in fiction
 "Time Travel", a Rob & Big episode
 Time Travel (Alessi's Ark album)
 Time Travel (Dave Douglas album)
 Time Travel (Never Shout Never album)
 Time Travel: A History, a 2016 non-fiction book by James Gleick

See also
 Mental time travel
 Time Traveler (disambiguation)
 Time Machine (disambiguation)